The Passport Index is an interactive online tool by Arton Capital that provides its users with insights about passports, including the ability to compare and rank the world's passports. Rankings are based on the freedom of movement and visa-free travel open to holders of particular passports. The site allows the display of various territories' passports using a variety of filters such as region and passport cover colour.

World Openness Score
The World Openness Score is a measure or index that tracks the ability of the world's population to travel visa-free.  It grew from 17,904 to 20,143 between 2015 and August 2018. But due to the COVID-19 pandemic in 2020, the index fell to about 13,000. Despite the COVID-19 pandemic, it rose again. In 2022, the index was nearly 22,000.

Methodology
The Passport Index compares passports mainly on their visa-free travel options, but also on how welcoming the countries are to visiting foreigners. In its ranking, The Passport Index looks at 193 United Nations member countries and six territories, which include ROC Taiwan, Macao (SAR China), Hong Kong (SAR China), Kosovo, Palestinian Territory and the Vatican. Territories annexed to other countries such as Norfolk Island (Australia), French Polynesia (France), British Virgin Islands (Britain) are excluded.

 Visa-free score: The Passport Index ranks passports based on a "total visa-free score," which assigns passports a point for each country their holders can visit without a visa, with a visa on arrival or by obtaining electronic travel authorization (ETA). The country with the highest visa-free score has the most powerful passport.
 Welcoming Score: The Passport Index awards one point to each country's passport which allows its bearer to enter visa-free or with visa on arrival. The country with the highest welcoming score is the most welcoming country in the world.
 World Openness Score: The World Openness Score is a measure that reflects the travel openness between countries. It has grown from 17,904 to 18,680 between 2015 and August 2017. On 21 November 2018 it had reached 20,189.
  Global Mobility Score: The Global Mobility Score is a benchmark that shows an individual's level of freedom of global mobility reflecting one or more passports in their possession. Higher scores reflect increased freedom of mobility.

Ranking
 Global Passport Power Rank: World's passports are ranked by their total visa-free score. Countries that share equal visa-free scores, are sorted by the number of visa-free countries portion of that score.
 Individual Passport Power Rank: Data from the latest UN Human Development Index is used to further break the ties and order the countries in unique ranks.
 Welcoming Countries Rank: The Passport Index ranks countries by how welcoming they are to other nationalities.

Results
Passport Index rankings are in real-time and continue to vary as new changes to visa agreements are made. For the most part, the Top 10 places have been occupied by European countries with the exception of Singapore and the United Arab Emirates.

Between 2017 and 2018, at top of the list with a visa-free score of 165 were Singapore and Germany, while the United States of America, South Korea, France, Denmark and Sweden were among the 11 countries that shared the second spot with a score of 164. The UAE passport now takes first place with a visa-free score of 177.

Table 
Scores and rankings are from the 2022 World Openness Score.

Case studies

United Arab Emirates
In 2017, The Passport Index was assigned to monitor the development of the newly launched UAE Passport Force Initiative, with the aim to position the Emirati passport on the list of the five most powerful passports in the world by 2021. By 31 October 2018, the Emirati passport had already reached fourth place. 

However in 2021, the passport's power trend dropped secondary to the COVID pandemic.

Background
The Passport Index was launched by Arton Capital, a financial services firm with a head office in Montreal, in 2014.

See also
 Henley Passport Index

References

External links
 Official site

Indexes
Travel-related organizations
International travel documents
Internet properties established in 2014